Haymes is a surname. Notable people with the surname include:

Bob Haymes (1923–1989), American singer, songwriter, actor
Bruce Haymes, Australian rock musician
Dick Haymes (1918–1980), Argentine actor and singer
Frederick Haymes (1849–1928), Australian cricketer
Henry Evered Haymes (1872–1904), British surgeon
Jerry Haymes (born 1940), American rock 'n roll artist
Joe Haymes (1907–1964), American jazz bandleader
Robert Leycester Haymes (1870–1942), Lieutenant-Colonel in the British Army